People named Adrian Hill include:

 Adrian Hill (1895–1977), British artist, author, art therapist, educator and broadcaster.

 Adrian V. S. Hill (born 1958), Director of the Jenner Institute and Professor of Vaccinology and of Human Genetics at the University of Oxford
 Adrian Hill (American football official)